Richard Emeric Quandt (born 1 June 1930, in Budapest) is a Guggenheim Fellowship-winning economist who analyzed the results of the Judgment of Paris wine tasting event with Orley Ashenfelter.

Quandt served as a professor of economics at Princeton University. In 1979 he was elected as a Fellow of the American Statistical Association. He was elected to the American Philosophical Society in 1991 and the American Academy of Arts and Sciences in 1994. He is current senior adviser to the Andrew W. Mellon Foundation.

Quandt is a member of the American Association of Wine Economists and editor of their journal, the Journal of Wine Economics.  In 2012, he was involved in organizing a blind tasting event comparing wines produced in France with several wines produced in New Jersey held at Princeton University and known as the "Judgment of Princeton."

He graduated from Princeton University(undergraduate) and Harvard University(graduate).

See also
 Goldfeld–Quandt test

Published works
The Changing Landscape in Eastern Europe: A Personal Perspective on Philanthropy and Technology Transfer Oxford University Press 2002 
(with Andrew Lass). Library automation in transitional societies: lessons from Eastern Europe. New York: Oxford University Press, 2000. .
 The Collected Essays of Richard E. Quandt (Economists of the Twentieth Century) Edward Elgar Publishing 1992 
Racetrack Betting: The Professor's Guide to Strategies Praeger Paperback 1991 
(with James M. Henderson). Microeconomic Theory: A Mathematical Approach Mcgraw-Hill College 1980

References

1930 births
Fellows of the American Statistical Association
Fellows of the Econometric Society
Living people
Econometricians
Princeton University faculty
Fellows of the American Academy of Arts and Sciences
Princeton University alumni
Harvard University alumni
Members of the American Philosophical Society